Catathyridium garmani is a species of sole in the family Achiridae. It was described by David Starr Jordan in 1889, originally under the genus Achirus. It is known from Argentina, Brazil, and Uruguay.

References

Pleuronectiformes
Fish described in 1889